The Thousand Hope Candidates (Turkish: Bin Umut Adayları) was an electoral alliance between four left-wing political parties in Turkey, formed in preparation for the 2007 general election. The alliance contested the election by fielding candidates from participating parties as independents in order to bypass the 10% election threshold needed to win seats in the Turkish Grand National Assembly. The alliance's candidates won a total of 1,334,518 votes and 22 seats in the election.

Lacking a realistic prospect of gaining parliamentary representation due to the 10% threshold, the pro-Kurdish Democratic Society Party (DTP), the socialist libertarian Freedom and Solidarity Party (ÖDP), the Labour Party (EMEP) and the Socialist Democracy Party (SDP) joined forces and decided to field candidates under a joint alliance, hence creating the Thousand Hope alliance. The alliance stated that its candidates included individuals who could extend the appeal of the political left to the general public, having also extended support to other left-wing candidates who were not part of the four member parties. The alliance fielded 65 candidates in 40 provinces. The Labour Party and the Freedom and Solidarity Party fielded their own candidates in the remaining 41 provinces but fell well short of the 10% electoral threshold.

The alliance was also in favour of minority rights, having openly campaigned as 'Kurds wanting peace'. Segments of society such as the LGBT community, which the alliance claimed had faced discrimination and oppression, played a major role in alliance's election campaign. Critics branded the alliance as Kurdish nationalist, pointing to the pro-Kurdish DTP, which was the biggest of the four participating parties.

A similar alliance, namely the Labour, Democracy and Freedom Bloc, was formed in preparation for the 2011 general election four years later.

General election performance

Results

This table only shows the votes won by the Thousand Hope candidates, who stood in 40 provinces. In the remaining 41 provinces, the Freedom and Solidarity Party and the Labour Party fielded their own candidates. The votes that they won in these other provinces that were not part of the Thousand Hope candidate alliance are not shown.
Swing and seat change is compared to the Democratic People's Party's performance in the 2002 general election
Provinces won by Thousand Hope candidates are coloured  in the map

Elected members
22 of a total of 65 candidates were elected. The combined votes won by Thousand Hope candidates were higher than any other party in the provinces of Tunceli, Diyarbakır, Muş, Iğdır, Hakkari and Şırnak. The results represented a significant swing to the governing Justice and Development Party (AKP), which made heavy gains in the Kurdish south-east were the Democratic People's Party had won back in 2002. Only 2 of the 22 Thousand Hope Candidates elected were from non-southeastern provinces, namely Ufuk Uras and Sebahat Tuncel from İstanbul's 1st and 3rd electoral district respectively. The following table shows the distribution of DTP, SDP, EMEP and ÖDP members within the 22 elected members.

The full list of members elected under the Thousand Hope banner are as follows:

Votes won by participating parties elsewhere
The Labour Party and the Freedom and Solidarity Party both fielded candidates as a party in electoral districts where the Thousand Hope Candidates did not run for election. The votes shares won by these parties are as follows.

See also
23rd Parliament of Turkey
Electoral system of Turkey
Peoples' Democratic Congress
Peace and Democracy Party
Kurdish nationalism
Labour, Democracy and Freedom Bloc

References

External links
ÖDP official website
SDP official website 
EMEP official website
The DTP, having been dissolved in 2009 and replaced by the Peace and Democracy Party, no longer has an active website.

2007 establishments in Turkey
Defunct Kurdish parties in Turkey
Defunct political party alliances in Turkey
Defunct socialist parties in Turkey
Political parties established in 2007